The 2019 FIL World Luge Championships took place under the auspices of the International Luge Federation at the Winterberg bobsleigh, luge, and skeleton track in Winterberg, Germany from 25 to 27 January 2019.

Schedule
Five events were held.

Medal summary

Medal table

Medalists

References

External links
Official website
FIL website

 
2019
FIL World Luge Championships
FIL World Luge Championships
International luge competitions hosted by Germany
Sports competitions in North Rhine-Westphalia
FIL World Luge Championships